Magnus Hart (born 20 April 1996) is a Chinese-born, Norwegian footballer.

Club career
Hart signed his first professional contract with Tippeligaen side Sarpsborg 08 in 2016, having made two substitute appearances for the Sarpsborg-based club the previous season. He signed for 2. Divisjon side Kvik Halden in 2017.

Career statistics

Club

Notes

References

1996 births
Living people
Sportspeople from Shanghai
Norwegian footballers
Association football midfielders
Eliteserien players
Norwegian Third Division players
Norwegian Fourth Division players
Drøbak-Frogn IL players
Fredrikstad FK players
Sarpsborg 08 FF players
Kvik Halden FK players